Text buffer  may refer to:
 In programming: 
 a text buffer is a region in memory where text is temporarily stored while it is been worked on by the CPU. The CPU can write and read to and from a text buffer, essentially manipulating text. The CPU might be moving it from one  location to another to fulfil a request by a user.  see Data buffer
 a part of video adapter's memory in a text mode;
 a backup (or mirror, or emulation) of that part in the system RAM, see e.g. virtual console.
 In text editors:
 same as clipboard (software), but for text only.